Kék is a village in Szabolcs-Szatmár-Bereg county, in the Northern Great Plain region of eastern Hungary. The village has nearly 2,000 inhabitants.

Populated places in Szabolcs-Szatmár-Bereg County